This is a list of Malawian Twenty20 International cricketers. In April 2018, the ICC decided to grant full Twenty20 International (T20I) status to all its members. Therefore, all Twenty20 matches played between Malawi and other ICC members after 1 January 2019 will have T20I status.

This list comprises all members of the Malawi cricket team who have played at least one T20I match. It is initially arranged in the order in which each player won his first Twenty20 cap. Where more than one player won his first Twenty20 cap in the same match, those players are listed alphabetically by surname. Malawi played their first T20I matches during the 2019 T20 Kwacha Cup in November 2019.

Key

List of players
Statistics are correct as of 25 November 2022.

Notes

References 

Malawi